Chloe Marisa Suazo Bridges DeVine, (born December 27, 1991), known professionally as Chloe Bridges, is an American actress. She is known for her roles as Zoey Moreno in the sitcom Freddie (2005–2006) and as Dana Turner in the Disney Channel original film Camp Rock 2: The Final Jam (2010). She has starred in the films Forget Me Not (2009), Family Weekend (2013), Mantervention (2014), The Final Girls (2015), and Nightlight (2015). She has also portrayed Donna LaDonna in The Carrie Diaries, Sydney in Pretty Little Liars, and Kibby in Daytime Divas.

Career
From 2005 until 2006, Bridges portrayed the role of Zoey Moreno in the ABC sitcom Freddie, starring alongside Freddie Prinze Jr. For this role, she was credited under her birth name, Chloe Suazo. In 2006, she guest-starred as the character in an episode of George Lopez. She has appeared in commercials for Adelphia and AT&T.

Bridges originally auditioned for the role of Mitchie Torres in the first Camp Rock film, the role ultimately went to Demi Lovato. She also appeared in the 2009 films Legally Blondes and Forget Me Not. She secured the role of Dana Turner in the sequel, Camp Rock 2: The Final Jam, which aired on Disney Channel in 2010. In March 2012, Bridges was cast as Donna LaDonna in The CW's Sex and the City prequel, titled The Carrie Diaries, which aired from 2013 to 2014 over two seasons.

In April 2014, she landed a recurring role in the fifth season of the ABC Family teen drama series Pretty Little Liars as Sydney Driscoll, the newest member of the swim team, who befriends Emily (Shay Mitchell). Bridges portrayed the supporting role of Paula in the horror comedy film The Final Girls (2015), and starred as Nia in the supernatural thriller film Nightlight (2015). The film, directed by Scott Beck and Bryan Woods, was released on March 27, 2015. In August 2016, Bridges was cast as Kibby, a former child star and recovering addict, in VH1's scripted drama series Daytime Divas, which premiered on June 5, 2017.

In 2018, Bridges starred as recurring role of Roxy Buckley in the American dark-comedy television web series, Insatiable.

Personal life

She attended John Muir Middle School and Burbank High School when her family moved to Los Angeles.

After meeting on the set of The Final Girls in 2014, Bridges began dating Adam DeVine in February 2015. In October 2019, the couple announced their engagement. The couple were married on October 9, 2021.

Bridges graduated from Columbia University with a BA in Political Science in 2020.

Filmography

Film

Television

Music videos

Video games

References

External links

 

21st-century American actresses
Actresses from Louisiana
American child actresses
American film actresses
American television actresses
Living people
People from Houma, Louisiana
Columbia University School of General Studies alumni
1991 births
American actresses of Honduran descent